Théophile Joseph Fras (10 October 1873 – 25 June 1933) was a French cyclist. He competed in the men's sprint event at the 1900 Summer Olympics. He died in a car accident in 1933.

References

External links
 

1873 births
1933 deaths
French male cyclists
Olympic cyclists of France
Cyclists at the 1900 Summer Olympics
Place of birth missing
Road incident deaths in France